Mostly Ape is an album by experimental rock trio Drums & Tuba, released on September 8, 2002 on Righteous Babe Records. It is their second album released on the label.

The album's title derives from a phrase the band often uses to describe humans' animalistic tendencies.

Recording
Brian Wolff, the band's tuba and trumpet player, said their goal in making the album was to "get people to say ‘I’ve never seen anything like that before in my life, and it fucking rocked.’" The album was recorded largely live in the studio, with minimal overdubs, over a period of one week.

Track listing
Brain Liaters	
Igor Rosso	
Sevens	
The Metrics	
4style	
Elephants	
Clashing	
Air Con Dee	
Superbee	
Breakfast with Miletus	
Goose Geese	
Magoo

Personnel
Neal McKeeby – guitar
Tony Nozero – drums, electronics
Brian Wolff – tuba, trumpet

References

Righteous Babe Records albums
Drums & Tuba albums
2002 albums